The Budapest Half Marathon (complete name: Wizz Air Budapest Half Marathon) is an annual road running competition over the half marathon distance  which takes place in Budapest, Hungary in September. The route starts and ends in City Park and winds through the city center, offering views of some of the city's main sights, such as Andrássy Avenue with the Opera House, the Danube from the Széchenyi Chain Bridge and the Parliament. The 2017 event took place on Sunday 10 September.

Race history

Between 1984 and 1993 annual half-marathon races were organized as a side event of the Budapest Marathon. In 1994 and 1995 the Budapest Marathon was discontinued and, since it was re-established in 1996, separate half-marathon races have been held in September, with Nike as the event's main supporter. From 2014 the event has a new main sponsor Wizz Air. The popularity of Budapest Half Marathon has constantly increased; the number of participants having grown from an initial 3000 to over 7000 individual runners. Currently the distance can be run either as an individual or as a relay in a teams of two or three. Competitors with disabilities may compete in wheelchairs.

Past winners
Source: Futanet, Half Marathon Race Guide 2013

Key:

"Finishers" refers to individuals completing the course, ignoring relay teams.

References

External links
Official website 

Sport in Budapest
Half marathons
Recurring sporting events established in 1984